Mykal Kilgore (born August 21, 1983) is an American singer and songwriter. His debut album, A Man Born Black, was released on September 6, 2019.

Early life
Mykal Kilgore was born and raised in Orlando, Florida. He attended Florida State University.

Career
Kilgore's theatre credits include Motown: The Musical, The Wiz Live!, and Hair. 

Kilgore released his debut album A Man Born Black in 2019. The album debuted at #2 on the iTunes R&B charts and on five different Billboard charts. In 2020, Kilgore received an NAACP Image Award nomination for Outstanding New Artist, as well as a SoulTracks Readers' Choice Awards nomination for New Artist of the Year. The lead single from A Man Born Black, "Let Me Go", received a Best Traditional R&B Performance nomination for the 63rd Annual Grammy Awards in 2021.

Personal life
Kilgore identifies as queer.

Discography

Studio albums

A Man Born Black (2019)

Acting credits

Theatre

References

External links 
 MykalKilgore.com

Singer-songwriters from Florida
1983 births
People from Orlando, Florida
People from Nashville, Tennessee
NAACP Image Awards
Living people
African-American  male singer-songwriters
American LGBT singers
LGBT African Americans
Queer men
Queer musicians
21st-century African-American male singers